The 1987–88 Georgia Tech Yellow Jackets men's basketball team represented Georgia Institute of Technology during the 1987–88 NCAA Division I men's basketball season. Led by head coach Bobby Cremins, the team finished the season with an overall record of 22-10 (8-6 ACC). The team reached the Round of 32 of the NCAA tournament.

Roster

Schedule and results

|-
!colspan=9 style=| Regular Season

|-
!colspan=9 style=| ACC Tournament

|-
!colspan=9 style=| NCAA Tournament

Rankings

References

Georgia Tech Yellow Jackets men's basketball seasons
Georgia Tech
Georgia Tech